Fall of the Damned into Hell is a Hieronymus Bosch painting made sometime before 1490. It is currently in the Gallerie dell'Accademia in Venice, Italy.

This painting is part of a four-panel polyptych; the others are Ascent of the Blessed, Terrestrial Paradise and Hell.

References

Paintings by Hieronymus Bosch
Hell in popular culture
1490s paintings
Paintings in the Gallerie dell'Accademia